The Centennial Conference men's basketball tournament is the annual conference basketball championship tournament for the NCAA Division III Centennial Conference. The tournament has been held annually since 1994. It is a single-elimination tournament and seeding is based on regular season records.

The tournament champion receives the Centennial's automatic bid to the NCAA Men's Division III Basketball Championship.

Format 
Ten teams compete in this competition and each team face the other team twice each season, so there are 18 within-conference matches each season. After the regular season, the fifth ranked team visit the fourth ranked team for the first round match. Then the final four tournament is hosted by the first ranked team. 

In 2004, the play-in match was played because Gettysburg and Haverford were tied for the fourth place, but the first round match has been always held between the fourth and the fifth ranked teams thereafter. Until 2003, ten teams were divided two east and west divisions and top two teams from each division advanced to the tournament while play-in match was played if two teams were tied for the second place in the division.

Results

Championship records

 Through 2023 tournament

Performance by school 

McDaniel (formerly Western Maryland) has not yet qualified for the Centennial tournament finals

Performance by year 

Key

References

NCAA Division III men's basketball conference tournaments
Basketball, Men's, Tournament
Recurring sporting events established in 1994